Daniel Aaron Goldman (born May 11, 1974) is an American writer, artist and producer living in Los Angeles. With a career spanning graphic novels, screenwriting, video games and augmented-reality, he is the creator of critically acclaimed works such as Shooting War, Red Light Properties and the Priya's Shakti series. He is the founder and Narrative Lead of the Los Angeles–based Kinjin Story Lab.

Early career
Entering the film industry from the last class to graduate from University of Miami's Cinema Arts department before it went digital, Dan moved to New York City with an instantly obsolete analog skill set. After a year working on film sets, he grew all too aware of the long road ahead before anyone would take him seriously as a storyteller. But as an avid comics reader, his attention always returned to those low-budget drawn stories, where he could produce an entire work as writer, director, cinematographer, actor, etc. all completely on his own.

He created his first full-length comic Hairkut in 1999, and took it out to the San Diego Comic-Con, where he met many lifelong friends and wound up working for a time in the marketing department of DC Comics while honing his skills as a storyteller.

Finding Hyperreal Comics
Working as a graphic designer, Dan began experimenting with vector-based design programs and the Wacom Intuos drawing stylus. There he had an epiphany, seeing a new kind of storytelling workflow to create comic narratives digitally. His first night at home with his very own Wacom stylus, he drew until dawn—realizing he could now draw whatever he could write. What began here is a still-continuing investigation into the limits of vector illustration and mixed-media storytelling that resulted in a new style of 100%-digital "Hyperreal Comics" that combined the medium's narrative language with an immersive feel drawing equally on the aesthetics magazine illustrations, cinema production, album artwork and video games.

Self-Publishing
With his brother Steven, Dan founded the boutique imprint FWDbooks in 2003, creating several titles as "the Brothers Goldman", including three issues of Styx Taxi and his first graphic novel, Everyman: Be the People. Under the credo Manga con Corazón (comics with heart), FWDbooks' releases featured consistently diverse characters of all genders and creeds, and their adult-focused stories addressed issues like mortality, the afterlife and electronic voting machines' subversion of democracy. Met with critical praise and distribution difficulties, FWbooks ceased to function in 2005, and Dan's jump to publishing his next works online was a direct result of this experience.

Webcomics
In early 2006, Goldman was recruited by Dean Haspiel to help found the "online laboratory for experimental comics anthology ACT-I-VATE. Originally a cabal of eight cartoonists serializing free online graphic novels, it was here Goldman began serializing his graphic novel "KELLY". A psychedelic NYC psychodrama about a jilted lover who taking emotional refuge with a stranger he meets on Craiglist, "KELLY" quickly becomes a meditation on identity, interior landscapes and love. Kelly was also a quantum leap with Dan's Hyperreal Comics style as he began incorporating more photographic elements and textured painted effects into his narrative art. Meanwhile, ACT-I-VATE grew from its initial eight member group blog on LiveJournal to become a New York Times-featured online anthology hosting long-form comics works by 50+ cartoonists from around the world. It was his work here that got the attention of journalist/producer Anthony Lappé.

In early 2006, serialization began on a collaboration with Lappé entitled Shooting War: a fiery dystopian satire of Big Media's perpetuation of the War on Terror. His work went on to garner an Eisner Award nomination for "Best Digital Comic" in 200, which was hailed as “the Apocalypse Now of the War on Terror” by Forbes. Published by Grand Central Publishing (US) with editions in Italian, French and Spanish, Shooting War was featured in publications like Wired Magazine and Brazil's Folha de São Paulo to India's Business Standard and Tokyo's Daily Yomiuri.

Journalism & Politics
In the rollup to the 2008 presidential election, Dan collaborated with journalist Michael Crowley on 08: A Graphic Diary of the Campaign Trail, a nonfiction graphic novel. After traveling with Crowley during the early 2008 primaries, Dan returned home to Brooklyn to begin what would become an 18-month sprint through 160 pages of black & white comics, written and drawn as they happened. The evening of the 2008 election, while people danced on top of cars downstairs from Dan's studio in Brooklyn, he was in fact upstairs drawing the people dancing on top of cars. "08" was a singular achievement in comics journalism, published and on bookstore shelves the week Obama was sworn into office. NPR Books praised it as “strik[ing] out on its own to create a method of visual storytelling that owes as much to ’60s magazine layouts as it does to modern Web design. It’s largely thanks to Goldman’s singular graphical style that this book… feels so defiantly and refreshingly unconventional.” The week of its release, “08” was touted as “highbrow brilliant” by New York Magazine.

During this period and over the following years, Dan also contributed political portraits several times a month to New York Magazine's "Intelligencer" column.

Brazil x Hollywood
Moving from NYC to São Paulo to work on more personal and spiritual material, Dan's next comic project Red Light Properties actually dates back to his pre-webcomics self-publishing days. The story of a husband-and-wife-owned real estate agency in Miami specializing in exorcising and selling “previously haunted homes”, Red Light Properties launched in 2010 on Tor.com as the venerable SF publisher's first long-form comics commission with an innovative bespoke interactivity designed by Goldman himself. A critical darling during its online serialization, the series was published independently in English, Spanish and Portuguese before being picked up by Monkeybrain Comics and ultimately published as a graphic novel by IDW Publishing.

During its three years of serialization, the series attracted many offers from Hollywood to adapt it into a film or television series. Upon his return to NYC, Dan began developing the comic as a cable series with a television producer, selling a development deal with a TV studio to write the pilot script, gaining him membership into the Writers Guild of America (WGA).

Video Games & Transmedia
While in Brazil, Dan was contracted by the AMC cable network to write a Facebook-based RPG (role-playing game) based on The Walking Dead. Not shying away from the simple sprite-based graphics, he instead wrote dark and complex narratives for the user to navigate their characters through, falling in love in the process with writing games himself.

Upon his return to New York, Dan would work as an editor and creative on AMC's Story Sync applications—real-time second-screen content to be served during the live broadcasts—for their flagship series Breaking Bad, Turn: Washington's Spies, The Killing and The Walking Dead (which of which won multiple Emmy Awards).

He also wrote the first two season of The Walking Dead: No Man's Land RTS mobile game, currently available for iOS and Android platforms.

Priya's Shakti
In 2014, Dan met Ram Devineni in New York City, and the two created the hugely popular augmented reality comic book series, Priya's Shakti. Funded by the World Bank and the Tribeca Film Institute, the series features the first Indian female superhero who is a rape survivor, and implements a layer of augmented-reality (AR) in every page of the comic. In the addition to the comics, the Priya's Shakti project has AR-enabled street murals in five cities in India and regularly updates an educational component that fosters discussion about gender-based violence in communities. Following its release, Priya was honored by UN Women as a “Gender Equality Champion”.

Priya's Shakti immediately went viral on its launch, with over 500,000 downloads and over 400 news stories reaching over 20 million readers. The second chapter, Priya's Mirror, finds Priya fighting for acid attack survivors. It premiered in 2016 at Lincoln Center in New York City as part of the NY Film Festival's Convergence lineup.

The third book, Priya and the Lost Girls, concerns human trafficking and was released in 2019.

Kinjin Story Lab
While traveling extensively across India in support of Priya, Dan began to understand the potential impact of his work in a different light. Viewing the Priya experience as a prototype for a new model for storytelling, Dan founded Kinjin Story Lab to develop new socially-conscious stories across evolving forms of media.

Bibliography
2017
 Dandelion 102 "Startup" (22pgs) Kinjin Studios

2016
 Dandelion 101 "Greatmother" (22pgs) Kinjin Studios
 Priya's Mirror (40pgs) Rattapallax Press

2015
 The Walking Dead: No Man's Land (iOS/Android) 

2014
 Red Light Properties Book One (200pgs) IDW Publishing
 Harbinger #25 "Cold Brains" (5pgs) Valiant Comics
 Priya's Shakti (36pgs) Rattapallax Press

2012
The Walking Dead: Chronicles Social Game (Facebook)

2011
 Red Light Properties "Goodnight Donnie Cheng" (18pgs), Monkeybrain/Comixology
 Red Light Properties "Know Thy Enema" (20pgs) Monkeybrain/Comixology
 Red Light Properties "Underwater" (27pgs) Monkeybrain/Comixology
 Red Light Properties "A Series of Tubes" (26pgs) Monkeybrain/Comixology

2010
 Red Light Properties (200pgs) Tor.com

2009
 "Yes We Will" (6pgs) Tor.com
 "Red Plastic" (8pgs) SMITHmag.com
 08: A Graphic Diary of the Campaign Trail (160pgs) Crown Books

2008
 "42nd & Lex" (4pgs) Popgun Vol. 2, Image Comics
 Shooting War (184pgs) Grand Central Publishing

2006
 "Kelly" (400pgs) activatecomix.com
 Shooting War (100pgs) shootingwar.com

2004
 Everyman: Be the People (96pgs) FWDbooks

2003
 "The Best I Ever Had" (24pgs) Flesh for the Beast, Shriek Show
 "Good Parenting" (24pgs) Flesh for the Beast, Shriek Show
 "Schmear" (6pgs) Smut Peddler Vol. 2, Saucy Goose Press
 "Singalong" (6pgs) Styx Taxi: A Little Twilight Music, FWDbooks

1999
 "Hairkut" (24pgs) self-produced

Exhibitions & Talks
2017
 "Imagine 2040" Civic Imagination Symposium, USC Annenberg Innovation Lab (Los Angeles, CA)
 Featured Project, Myriad Festival, Brisbane Powerhouse (Brisbane, Australia)
 "Art & Activism Presentation", Copenhagen Documentary Festival (Denmark)
 Jury Prize Winner, FilmGate Miami 2017 (Miami, FL)
 FrankTalks & Exhibition, Changeville Festival, College of Journalism and Communications, University of Florida (Gainesville, FL)
 Master Class, National Institute of Design (Ahmedabad, India)
 Master Class, National Institute of Design R&D Campus (Bengaluru, India)
 "Virtual Storytelling Creators Workshop" MOP Vaishnav College for Women (Chennai, India)
 Master Class, L.V. Prasad Film & TV Academy (Chennai, India)
 International Guest, DOGS Comics Conference, Jadavpur University (Kolkata, India)

2016
 9th International Conference on Interactive Digital Storytelling, USC School of Creative Technologies (Los Angeles, CA)
 "Solidarity (thru Comics)" Books in Browsers (San Francisco, CA)
 "Priya's Mirror" ArtBo Art Festival (Bogotá, Colombia)
 "AR Mural" St+Art Street Art Festival (Bangalore, India)
 "Priya's Sheroes" Sheroes Cafe (Agra, India)
 "Priya's Mirror" NY Film Festival Convergence (Lincoln Center, New York, NY)
 One World Festival (Czech Republic)
 "A Comic Book Superhero and Rape Survivor: Can She Change Attitudes Toward Sexual Violence?", Dresher Center (Baltimore, MD)

2015
 Priya Named "Gender Equality Champion" by UN Women
 "Interactive Comic Books for Social Change", SXSW Interactive (Austin, TX)
 Tribeca Interactive Playground, Tribeca Film Festival (New York, NY)
 "Build Your Own Comic Workshop", PEN World Voices Festival (New York City, NY)
 Webdox Conference at iFlab: Interactive Factual Lab (Leuven, Belgium)
 Scuola Holden: Storytelling and Performing Arts (Torino, Italy)
 InterDocsBarcelona. (Barcelona, Spain)
 "The Immersive Sixth Sense" Museum of Moving Images (Queens, NY)
 "I Stand with Priya" TEDxCoventGardenWomen (London, UK)
 DOKWeb - Institute of Documentary Film, A4, Priestor Center (Bratislava, Slovakia)
 "AR Mural" Sheffield DocFest (Sheffield, UK)
 Cooler Lumpur Festival 2015 (Kuala Lumpur, Malaysia)
 "Interactive Media for Social Good" Made in IFP Media Center (Brooklyn, NY)
 Passion for Freedom Festival, London at the Mall Galleries (London UK)
 NINA Beta Version Festival, National Audiovisual Institute (Warszawa, Poland)
 "Priya's Shakti" Augmented Reality Gallery Exhibition, City Lore Gallery (New York, NY)
 Featured Guest, Delhi Comic-Con (New Delhi, India)

2014
 PEN World Literature Festival (New York, NY)
 Featured International Guest, Mumbai Comic-Con (Mumbai, India)

2012
 Featured Guest, Rio Comic-Con (Rio de Janeiro, Brazil)

2011
 Selected Artist, Illustration Now! 4, Taschen Books
 ZUPI Magazine Pixel Show (São Paulo, Brazil)

2010
 3M Mostra de Arte Digital (São Paulo, Brazil)

2009
 "Making Comics with Computers 2009" (moderator/curator), New York Comic-Con (NYC, NY)
 "An Election in Words & Pictures", Book Court (Brooklyn, NY)

2008
 "Making Comics with Computers 2008" (moderator/curator), New York Comic-Con (NYC, NY)

2007
 "Best Digital Comic" Eisner Award Nomination
 “Iraq: The Graphic War, Today and In 2011″, Institute of Contemporary Arts (London, UK)
 "ACT-I-VATE Webcomics Collective Showcase" (moderator), New York Comic-Con (YC, NY)

References

 
 20-page excerpt of 08: A Graphic Diary of the Campaign Trail
 The Daily Beast: Exclusive Excerpt from 08: A Graphic Diary of the Campaign Trail
 "Closing the Invisible Distance Essay" for Powell's Books
 FORA.tv Video of Haight Booksmith Presentation
 The Village Voice review of Shooting War
 Newsweek on Shooting War

Interviews 
 comiXology podcast interview
 Gothamist interview with Rachel Kramer Bussel

American comics artists
American comics writers
1974 births
Living people
People from North Miami Beach, Florida